Carpatolechia filipjevi is a moth of the family Gelechiidae. It is found in Russia (southern Ural and southern Siberia).

References

Moths described in 1993
Carpatolechia
Moths of Asia
Moths of Europe